Kalte Herberge is a mountain of Hesse, Germany.

Mountains of Hesse
Rheingau-Taunus-Kreis
Mountains and hills of the Taunus
High Taunus
Rheingau